Doug Reynolds (born 4 September 1933) is a former Australian rules footballer who played with Footscray and Richmond in the Victorian Football League (VFL) during the 1950s. He played as a centreman in the 1954 VFL Grand Final, kicking a goal in the Bulldogs' first premiership win.

References 
 Hogan P: The Tigers of Old, Richmond FC, Melbourne 1996

External links

1933 births
Living people
Australian rules footballers from Victoria (Australia)
Western Bulldogs players
Western Bulldogs Premiership players
Richmond Football Club players
One-time VFL/AFL Premiership players